Dorrett Davis is a former Jamaican cricketer. She made her Women's One Day International debut during the 1973 Women's Cricket World Cup against Young England in a group stage match where fellow Jamaican players Leila Williams, Madge Stewart, Elaine Emmanual, Loretta McIntosh, Evelyn Bogle and Yvonne Oldfield also made their maiden international appearance in the inaugural Women's Cricket World Cup.

References

External links 
 

Possibly living people
Year of birth missing (living people)
Date of birth missing (living people)
Jamaican women cricketers
West Indian women cricketers